Reader, I Married Him: Stories inspired by Jane Eyre is a 2016 anthology of short stories, edited by Tracy Chevalier,  inspired by the line "Reader, I married him" from Jane Eyre by Charlotte Brontë. It was commissioned to mark the 200th anniversary of the author's birth, and is published by The Borough Press, an imprint of HarperCollins.

Authors
The authors of the stories are all women:
 Tracy Chevalier
Tessa Hadley                                         
Sarah Hall                                              
Helen Dunmore                                    
Kirsty Gunn                                           
Joanna Briscoe                                    
Jane Gardam                                           
Emma Donoghue                                 
Susan Hill                                                 
Francine Prose                                    
Elif Shafak                                             
Evie Wyld                                                
Patricia Park                                        
Salley Vickers                                      
Nadifa Mohamed                                 
Esther Freud                                         
Linda Grant                                           
Lionel Shriver                                     
Audrey Niffenegger                        
Namwali Serpell                                 
Elizabeth McCracken

References

2016 anthologies
American anthologies
British anthologies
Fiction anthologies
Works based on Jane Eyre